The Clark River is a river of northwestern South Island of New Zealand. The river flows northwest from its source in the Kahurangi National Park to reach the Aorere River at the foot of the Wakamarama Range  from the Aorere's outflow into Golden Bay.

See also
List of rivers of New Zealand

References
Land Information New Zealand - Search for Place Names

Rivers of the Tasman District
Kahurangi National Park
Rivers of New Zealand